Holmlia Sportsklubb is a Norwegian sportsclub from the multi-cultural borough of Holmlia in Oslo, with sections for football, handball, floorball and futsal.

The men's football team plays in the 4. divisjon from 2013, having last played in the 3. divisjon in 2012. The club is also notable for developing talents, who are sold to the Norwegian top division clubs such as Vålerenga and Lillestrøm. Former players include Mohammed Fellah, Mathis Bolly, Jonathan Parr, Akinsola Akinyemi, Haitam Aleesami, Ohi Omoijuanfo, Chuma Anene and Adama Diomande.

The club has won six Norwegian championship in floorball, five for women and one for men.

References

External links
 Official site 

Football clubs in Oslo
Association football clubs established in 1983
Sports clubs in Norway
1983 establishments in Norway